Michelle Lynn Wachs is an American mathematician who specializes in algebraic combinatorics and works as a professor of mathematics at the University of Miami.

Contributions
Wachs and her advisor Adriano Garsia are the namesakes of  the Garsia–Wachs algorithm for optimal binary search trees, which they published in 1977.
She is also known for her research on shellings for simplicial complexes, partially ordered sets, and Coxeter groups, and on random permutation statistics and set partition statistics.

Education
Wachs earned her doctorate in 1977 from the University of California, San Diego, under the supervision of Adriano Garsia. Her dissertation was Discrete Variational Techniques in Finite Mathematics.

Recognition
In 2012 Wachs became one of the inaugural fellows of the American Mathematical Society. In 2013 she and her husband, mathematician Gregory Galloway (the chair of the mathematics department at Miami) were recognized as Simons Fellows. A conference in her honor was held in January 2015 at the University of Miami.

Selected publications

References

Year of birth missing (living people)
Living people
20th-century American mathematicians
21st-century American mathematicians
American women mathematicians
Combinatorialists
University of California, San Diego alumni
University of Miami faculty
Fellows of the American Mathematical Society
20th-century women mathematicians
21st-century women mathematicians
20th-century American women
21st-century American women